MEDICC (Medical Education Cooperation with Cuba) is a non-profit organization founded in 1997 that works to enhance cooperation among the US, Cuban and global health communities through its programs.

MEDICC supports education and development of human resources in health committed to equitable access and quality care, providing the Cuban experience to inform global debate, practice, policies and cooperation in health.

History
MEDICC was founded in 1997 as a way to foster communication and cooperation between the US and Cuban medical/public health communities, within the context of promoting health equity by “mining” the Cuban experience.

During the 1997–2004 period, MEDICC built a program around the medical and public health schools in the two countries, allowing the partnership to generate a range of new activities for students and staff:  research, teaching, clinical practice, and health policy.  Elective courses in Cuba for US medical, public health and nursing students constituted MEDICC’s core program for several years.  An Academic Council was established to oversee course content, made up of an equal number of US and Cuban medical educators.

By 2004, nearly 1,000 students from some 125 US medical, nursing, and public health schools had traveled to Cuba to take these two to eight-week courses—mainly placing students with family physicians throughout the island. A number of faculty members and health professionals also traveled to Cuba to research the country’s health system model.  In 2004, when the administration of George W. Bush curtailed student travel to Cuba, MEDICC was forced to eliminate the student exchange and other student-faculty travel programs.

Current work

MEDICC Review
MEDICC Review:  International Journal of Cuban Health and Medicine is a quarterly  peer-reviewed journal, which publishes original scientific articles by Cuban and international medical and population health scientists, features, interviews and opinion pieces. Its international Editorial Board is composed of nearly 40 health and medical professionals from 13 countries in the Americas, Europe and Africa. MEDICC Review is available online (open access to developing country readers), and in print. Cuba Health Reports, its companion news service, is available free of charge, and includes weekly health news briefs from Cuba, plus stories written by MEDICC Review journalists in Cuba, and based on primary sources.

Distribution of the film ¡SALUD!
Winner of the Council on Foundation’s Henry Hampton Award (2008) and selected by the American Library Association as an ALA Notable Video, ¡SALUD! is distributed in the United States and internationally by MEDICC.

This feature film, directed by Academy Award nominee Connie Field, and produced by Connie Field and Gail Reed, explores the competing values that mark the battle for health care everywhere.  Filmed in Cuba, South Africa, The Gambia, Honduras and Venezuela, accompanies some of the nearly 30,000 Cuban health professionals serving in over 60 countries. Their stories and those of young medical students in Cuba – now numbering 25,000 from Latin America & the Caribbean, Africa, Asia and the USA – suggest bold new approaches to making health care a global birthright. The film is available in English, French, Spanish and Portuguese. Former US President, Jimmy Carter, Mirta Roses Periago, MD, Director, Pan American Health Organization (PAHO) and Paul Farmer, MD, founder and Executive VP of Partners in Health have commented upon ¡SALUD!.

¡SALUD! was reviewed by Ann Sparanese in Social Responsibilities Round Table Newsletter, American Library Association, June 2008 and Hugh H. Tilson, MD, DrPH, University of North Carolina School of Public Health in the American Journal of Preventive Medicine, May 2008.

Professional Bridges to Health
MEDICC supports US health professionals undertaking field research in Cuba by providing them with fellowships, background materials and guidance on research objectives.  The organization also works to identify opportunities for these professionals to publish their research findings.

MEDICC provides fellowships to Cuban health professionals to study and attend conferences in the US, enabling them to engage in continuing medical education and dialogue with specialists in their fields.

The Community Partnerships for Health Equity program
The Community Partnerships for Health Equity program, formerly the Faculty-Community Leadership Program promotes US university-community partnerships that explore the relevance of the Cuban experience to confronting health issues that challenge their local communities.  MEDICC serves as a consultant to these groups, which have been established thus far in Los Angeles and Oakland, California.

Literature for Cuban Medical Schools
MEDICC provides the Cuban National Medical Library with subscriptions to 40 print journals; and, in cooperation with the World Health Organization's HINARI program and EBSCO 6,200 on-line journals for professionals and students island-wide.

MEDICC has donated 6,000 latest-edition textbooks to all 23 Cuban schools of medical science, where international and Cuban students study medicine, nursing and allied health professions.  These books,  in basic sciences and 55 clinical fields, help ensure that current medical thinking informs teaching on these campuses.

MEDICC is an official supporting organization of HIFA2015 (Healthcare Information For All by 2015).

Backpack Library for New MDs
Support for International Medical Students & Graduates at the Latin American Medical School (ELAM) enhances the impact of Cuban medical training for students from developing countries by helping the graduates to successfully re-integrate into their country’s health system environments and workforces.

Every year, MEDICC issues  The Merck Manual and, jointly with the Pan American Health Organization (PAHO),  PAHO’s Control of Communicable Diseases to 1,500 graduates of the Latin American Medical School from nearly 30 countries.  The books also go to the top 300 Cuban medical graduates.  These books serve as key references for these new physicians, many of them heading out to practice in the most remote regions of their countries.

US medical students in Cuba
MEDICC also provides support to the nearly 100 low-income and minority students from the United States, enrolled in Havana’s Latin American Medical School. Like students from the other 28 countries represented at the school, US students, in exchange for a full scholarship, pledge to return to practice in underserved communities throughout the US.  MEDICC aims to aid graduates by offering the Mnisi Fellowship which covers the cost of the US medical boards and preparatory courses for the exam.  The program bears the name of Dr.Thabo Mnisi, a South African physician trained in Cuba who dedicated his life to health equity for his community and patients, and directed the well-known Alexandra Clinic in Johannesburg until his death in 2006.

In addition to offering the fellowship to qualified American graduates of the ELAM, MEDICC supports the students by offering advice and information about summer volunteer opportunities in US medical facilities, providing recommendations and support for residency placement, and issuing updated materials about the Latin American Medical School to US residency directors.

Honduras’ First Garifuna Hospital
More students from Honduras’ Garifuna indigenous communities are enrolled in the Latin American Medical School than have studied medicine in the entire history of their country.  The first students graduated in 2005 and immediately went to work building the first Garifuna hospital in Honduras.  The facility, which provides medical staff and hospital beds for rural patients, serves as a local model for providing health care in outlying areas where permanent Honduran medical staff and beds are rare.  MEDICC has joined California labor unions and other US nongovernmental organizations in supporting this project.  In December 2007, MEDICC staff joined recently graduated Garifuna physicians, Cuban doctors, the local community and other US delegates to the opening of the hospital in Ciriboya, Honduras.

South African Medical Students in Cuba
South African physicians-in-training in Cuba have the advantage of cultural affinity with their future patients:  like most of the international medical students in Cuba, these young people come from the poor communities they’ll return to serve.  And the language of their medical training—Spanish—also gives them an extra tool for communicating across borders.

Despite these language and cultural competencies, re-entry into the traditionally English-based medical hierarchy in their country presents a challenge.  MEDICC supports these students by providing them with medical language CDs and texts in English that will sustain their self-confidence and make it easier for them to find suitable medical positions when they return home.

Haitian medical students in Cuba
Haitian medical students in Cuba—number some 700—study at the Santiago de Cuba “Caribbean campus” of the Latin American Medical School. After training in Cuba they are required to return home and serve in their own country which is the poorest in the hemisphere. For these students, Creole is their native language and the language of their patients; Spanish is the language of their medical instruction; and to date, French is the language of medicine in Haiti. A comprehensive glossary of 4,000 medical terms in French, Spanish and Creole was produced by MEDICC to aid the transition of these students back to Haiti where they will be practicing medicine. After the earthquake in Haiti on January 12, 2010, English was added to the glossary, in collaboration with the Hesperian Foundation, as a means of supporting international teams of healthcare workers in Haiti.

After the devastation of the earthquake in Haiti, 400+ Haitian ELAM graduates worked with Cuban medical personnel to meet immediate emergency medical needs. Long-term, the Haitian doctors are part of a mission partnered with the health ministry, Cuban physicians and other cooperating organizations to build a stable health system in Haiti.

Publications

Writings and Broadcasts by MEDICC Board, Staff & Scholars
 "9 Ways for US to Talk to Cuba and for Cuba to Talk to US"—Bourne, Peter G. January, 2009. Center for Democracy in the Americas.
 "Salud Para Todo: Cuba’s Revolutionary Approach Towards the Fulfillment of the Right to Health"—Evans, Dabney P. 2008. In Patricia Cholewka, Mitra M Motlagh (Editors), Health Capital and Sustainable Socioeconomic Development(chapter 15) Taylor & Francis, CRC Press
 "Cuba's HIV/AIDS Strategy: An Integrated, Rights-Based Approach"—Gorry, C. Oxfam, July 2008.
 "La estrategia cubana de respuesta al VIH/sida: Un enfoque integral con base en los derechos"—Gorry, C. Oxfam, julio 2008.
 "An Interview with C. William Keck, M.D., M.P.H., F.A.C.P.M. and Gail Reed, M.S." Social Medicine in Practice, Vol 3 No.1, January 2008
 "Cast of thousands: Cuba's contribution to global health"—Gorry, C. HealthLink. March 2007;143.
 Natural and Traditional Medicine in Cuba: Lessons for U.S. Medical Education—Appelbaum, D., Kligler, B., Barrett, B., Frenkel, M., Guerrera, M.P., Kondwani, K.A., Lee, B.B. & Tattelman, E. Academic Medicine, 2006;81(12):1098-103.

Writings by MEDICC's Professional Bridges Participants
 UCSF Faculty Get Insiders' Look at Cuban Health Care System—Robin Hindery, UCSF Today, January 2009
 Medical Education & Health Equity: An Opportunity for the New Administration—Fitzhugh Mullan, MD, Murdock Head Professor of Medicine and Health Policy, Professor of Pediatrics, George Washington University, Washington DC, Health Affairs, The Policy Journal of the Health Sphere, December 2008
 Integrating health and human security into foreign policy: Cuba's Surprisng Success—Robert Huish and Jerry Spiegel, The International Journal of Cuban Studies, Volum 1, Issue 1, June 2008
  Can Lessons Learned from a Cuban Experience Improve Health Disparities in South Los Angeles?—Fred Dominguez, MD, MPH & Alex N. Ortega, PhD, Ethnicity & Disease, Volume 18, Spring 2008
  "Going where no doctor has gone before: the role of Cuba's Latin American School of Medicine in meeting the needs of some of the world's most vulnerable populations"—Robert Huish, PhD, Journal of the Royal Institute of Public Health, 2008 Jun;122(6):552-7. Epub 2008 May 7
 "Disaster Preparedness: My Lessons Learned from Cuba"—Amelia Muccio, Director of Disaster Planning, New Jersey Primary Care Association, Hamilton, New Jersey, NJPCA & NJSORH Quarterly Newsletter, Winter 2008
  "Cuban Medical Internationalism and the Development of the Latin American School of Medicine"—Robert Huish and John M. Kirk (2007), Latin American Perspectives, 34; 77
 "Lessons from the Cuban Healthcare and Medical Education Systems"—Theodore C. Friedman, MD, Associate Professor of Medicine-UCLA School of Medicine, Charles R. Drew University of Medicine and Science, The Charles R. Drew The RCMI-faculty Development Core, July 2007
  "International Health Diplomacy: Examining the Cuban Model"—Jessica Evert, MD and Thomas Novotny, MD, University of California, San Francisco School of Medicine, April 2007
  "Correspondence from Abroad: The Cuban Paradox"—Susan E. Birch MBA, RN & Linda Norlander MS, RN AJN, American Journal of Nursing, Volume 107 Number 3, March 2007
  "The Cuban Health Care System"—Matthew Anderson, MD, MSc, Professor Family & Social Medicine, Albert Einstein College of Medicine, Bronx, NY. The Social Medicine Portal, January 2006
  "Change in Cuban Social Work Education: Government Response to Emerging Societal Problems"—David L. Strug, PH.D, Professor, Social Work, Wurzweiler School of Social Work, Yeshiva University, Cuba Today: Continuity and Change since the "Periodico Especial" Bildner Center for Hemisphere Studies, The Graduate Center, CUNY, October 2004.

References

External links
  "Disaster Relief Management in Cuba.Why Cuba’s disaster relief model is worth careful study"—Jonathan Keyser and Wayne Smith, May 2009, International Policy Report

Medical and health organizations based in California
Healthcare in Cuba
Foreign charities operating in Cuba
Cuba–Haiti relations